"I Know Where Love Lives" is a song written and recorded by American country music artist Hal Ketchum. It was released in October 1991 as the second single from his album Past the Point of Rescue. The song reached number 13 on the Billboard Hot Country Singles & Tracks chart in early 1992.

Music video
The music video was directed by Richard Kooris and premiered in late 1991.

Chart performance

References

1991 singles
Hal Ketchum songs
Songs written by Hal Ketchum
Song recordings produced by Allen Reynolds
Curb Records singles
1991 songs